Norwegian County Road 404 (Fv 404) is a Norwegian county road in Agder county, Norway. The road connects to the Norwegian National Road 41 at Søre Herefoss and it connects to the European route E18 highway at Frivoll. The road passes between the two lakes Syndle and Rore in rural Grimstad, just northeast of the village of Roresand. Prior to a 2010 government reform, the road was classified as a Norwegian national road.

References

404
Road transport in Agder
Grimstad
Birkenes